Sophie Payten (born 28 December 1992), known professionally as Gordi, is an Australian folktronica singer/songwriter. Her music has been featured in various television series and films: her 2015 single "Can We Work It Out" featured in the seventh series of The Vampire Diaries, her 2017 single "Heaven I Know" featured in the tenth series of The Walking Dead, and her 2017 song "Something Like This" featured in the 2020 teen romantic comedy To All the Boys: P.S. I Still Love You.

Career
Payten began receiving both national and international attention after playing independently across Sydney whilst at university and releasing tracks online through government-funded national Australian radio station Triple J's Unearthed radio. Gordi was nominated for the 2015 Unearthed Artist of the Year J Award from Triple J, the 2015 Next Big Thing SMAC (Sydney Music, Arts & Culture) Award from FBi Radio, and was dubbed one of the 40 best new bands of 2016 by Stereogum. Payten signed record deals with Jagjaguwar in the United States in February 2016 and Liberation Music in Australia in April 2016. Gordi then released her debut EP Clever Disguise in May 2016. The EP was written entirely by Payten, collaborating with producers and mixers Ben McCarthy, Alex Somers and Francois Tetaz.

Gordi has toured with Bon Iver, Of Monsters and Men, The Tallest Man on Earth, Highasakite, and Ásgeir. Payten also sang backing vocals for Bon Iver on their appearance on The Tonight Show Starring Jimmy Fallon in September 2016.

Gordi's debut LP Reservoir, released on 25 August 2017, was co-produced by Payten in part with Alex Somers in his studio in Iceland, Tim Anderson in Los Angeles and Ali Chant in New York City. On the album track "I'm Done", S. Carey is a featured vocalist. Payten is credited with singing backing vocals on S. Carey’s 2018 album Hundred Acres. She is also featured on "Postcard" from Troye Sivan’s 2018 album Bloom.

Throughout 2019, Payten worked at Prince of Wales Hospital as a doctor, after completing her medical studies at The University of New South Wales in 2018. In January 2020, Payten released her first single in almost three years called "The Cost", with profits going to the 2020 Australian Bushfire Relief. She also released a  single "Indifferent" with Willaris. K, which appeared on his EP Lustre. Payten's second studio album Our Two Skins was released on 26 June 2020. The album, co-produced by Payten with Chris Messina and Zach Hanson, was recorded in a cottage on Payten's family farm in Canowindra. Payten's first single from the record, "Sandwiches", was released in February, followed by "Aeroplane Bathroom" in March, "Volcanic", in May, and "Unready" and "Extraordinary Life", both released in June. Music videos were released alongside all five singles.

In May 2022, Payten released a single "Way I Go" from her forthcoming EP Inhuman which was scheduled to be released on 15 July 2022. It will be Payten's first non-remix, live, or acoustic EP since the release of Clever Disguise in 2016. Inhuman was delayed until 19 August 2022.

In March 2023, Gordi released "Broke Scene", which was co-produced by Ethan Gruska.

Personal life
Payten has been in a relationship  with singer-songwriter Alex Lahey since 2017. In 2021 the two released a single, "Dino's", with a music video directed by Nick Mckk.

Payten's 2020 single "Sandwiches" was dedicated to her grandmother after she died.

Discography

Studio albums

Extended plays

Remix EPs

Singles

As lead artist

As featured artist

Guest appearances

Awards and nominations

AIR Awards
The Australian Independent Record Awards (commonly known informally as AIR Awards) is an annual awards night to recognise, promote and celebrate the success of Australia's Independent Music sector.

! 
|-
|rowspan="2"| 2021
| "Extraordinary Life"
| Independent Song of the Year
| 
|rowspan="2"| 
|-
| Our Two Skins
| Best Independent Pop Album or EP
|

ARIA Music Awards
The ARIA Music Awards is an annual awards ceremony that recognises excellence, innovation, and achievement across all genres of Australian music. Gordi has received one nomination.

|-
! scope="row"| 2020  
| Our Two Skins 
| Best Adult Contemporary Album 
|

Australian Music Prize
The Australian Music Prize (the AMP) is an annual award of $30,000 given to an Australian band or solo artist in recognition of the merit of an album released during the year of award.

! 
|-
! scope="row"| 2020
| Our Two Skins
| Australian Music Prize
| 
| 
|-

Australian Women in Music Awards
The Australian Women in Music Awards is an annual event that celebrates outstanding women in the Australian Music Industry who have made significant and lasting contributions in their chosen field. They commenced in 2018.

! 
|-
| rowspan="2" | 2018
| Sophie Payten (Gordi)
| Songwriter Award
| 
| rowspan="2" | 
|-
| Sophie Payten (Gordi)
| Artistic Excellence Award
|

J Award
The J Awards are an annual series of Australian music awards that were established by the Australian Broadcasting Corporation's youth-focused radio station Triple J. They commenced in 2005.

! 
|-
! scope="row"| 2015
| Herself
| Unearthed Artist of the Year
| 
| 
|-
! scope="row"| 2017
| Reservoir
| Australian Album of the Year
| 
| 
|-
! scope="row" rowspan="2"| 2020
| Our Two Skins
| Australian Album of the Year
| 
| scope="row" rowspan="2"|
|-
| Herself
| Double J Australian Artist of the Year
|

Music Victoria Awards
The Music Victoria Awards, are an annual awards night celebrating Victorian music. They commenced in 2005.

! 
|-
| 2021
| "Dino's" (with Alex Lahey)
| Best Victorian Song
| 
|
|-

Rolling Stone Australia Awards
The Rolling Stone Australia Awards are awarded annually in January or February by the Australian edition of Rolling Stone magazine for outstanding contributions to popular culture in the previous year.

! 
|-
| 2022
| Herself
| Rolling Stone Readers' Choice Award
| 
|
|-

Notes

References

External links
 

Australian singer-songwriters
Living people
21st-century Australian singers
Australian LGBT singers
1992 births